The Solomon Islands requires its residents to register their motor vehicles and display vehicle registration plates. Until 2014 motorists usually made their own plates, but since 2014 the Solomon Islands Government have issued them. . Current plates are Australian standard 372 mm × 134 mm.

References

Solomon Islands
Transport in the Solomon Islands
Solomon Islands transport-related lists